Palmitoyl-CoA is an acyl-CoA thioester. It is an "activated" form of palmitic acid and can be transported into the mitochondrial matrix by the carnitine shuttle system (which transports fatty acyl-CoA molecules into the mitochondria), and once inside can participate in beta-oxidation. Alternatively, palmitoyl-CoA is used as a substrate in the biosynthesis of sphingosine (this biosynthetic pathway does not require transfer into the mitochondria).

Biosynthesis 
Palmitoyl CoA formed from palmitic acid, in the reaction below. 

Palmitate + CoA-SH + ATP -> Palmitoyl-CoA + AMP + Pyrophosphate

This reaction is often referred to as the "activation" of a fatty acid. The activation is catalyzed by palmitoyl-coenzyme A synthetase and the reaction proceeds through a two step mechanism, in which palmitoyl-AMP is an intermediate. The reaction is driven to completion by the exergonic hydrolysis of pyrophosphate.

The activation of fatty acids occurs in the cytosol and beta-oxidation occurs in the mitochondria. However, long chain fatty acyl-CoA cannot cross the mitochondrial membrane.  If palmitoyl-CoA is to enter the mitochondria, it must react with carnitine in order to be transported across: 

Palmitoyl-CoA + Carnitine <-> Palmitoyl-Carnitine + CoA-SH 

This transesterification reaction is catalyzed by carnitine palmitoyl transferase. Palmitoyl-Carnitine may translocate across the membrane, and once on matrix side, the reaction proceeds in reverse as CoA-SH is recombined with palmitoyl-CoA, and released. Unattached carnitine is then shuttled back to the cytosolic side of mitochondrial membrane.

Beta-Oxidation 
Once inside the mitochondrial matrix, palmitoyl-CoA may undergo β-oxidation. The full oxidation of palmitic acid (or palmitoyl-CoA) results in 8 acetyl-CoA's, 7 NADH, 7 , and 7 FADH2. The full reaction is below: 

Palmitoyl-CoA +7CoA-SH + 7NAD+ + 7FAD -> 8Acetyl-CoA + 7NADH + 7H+ + 7FADH2

Sphingolipid Biosynthesis 
Palmitoyl-CoA is also the starting substrate, along with Serine, for sphingolipid biosynthesis. Palmitoyl CoA and Serine participate in a condensation reaction catalyzed by serine C-palmitoyltransferase (SPT), in which 3-ketosphinganine is formed. These reactions occur in the cytosol.

Additional images

See also
Coenzyme A CoA

References

Thioesters of coenzyme A
Organophosphates
Palmitate esters